aka tomolennon is a self-taught visual artist, poet, and musician.

Art
Nagamoto's early work was often focused on urban figurative painting. His series of life-sized figurative portraits of dreaming girls entitled "Sleeping Beauty" was exhibited at Japanese Canadian Cultural Centre in 2007. His artwork was often created in collaboration with accomplished fashion industry artists, photographers, makeup artists, hairstylists, and fashion designers.

His first photography exhibition "Universe" continued in this fashion with photographic media. In large scale photographs, Nagamoto created portraits of the all encompassing dreams of youth, idealization and melancholy.

In 2008, Nagamoto started a new technique for his compositions; the use of ball-point pen and parchment. This style of art gained him critical success when he was featured on Bravo television in Star Portraits for his portrait of Canadian actor and icon Gordon Pinsent.

Poetry
As a visual artist as well as poet, Nagamoto often creates artwork featuring quotations and Haiku. "Hitch-Haiku" is a series of selected Haiku masters from both the East and West, ancient and modern, include 17th century's first great master Matsuo Bashō and the beat icons Jack Kerouac and William S. Burroughs.

In 2008, he self-published a poetry/illustration book entitled "Bittersweet Hotel". His theatrical poetry reading performance premiered in Osaka, Japan.

His series "Life Lessons" is a project that aims to bridge the growing gap between the visual arts and literature by creating an artist book featuring hand-drawn portraits of historical icons past and present with their famous quotes. Currently running over 25 episodes (as of May 2012), Life Lessons in the Japanese edition was made into a magazine series which has been continuously published in Bits magazine, a Japanese cultural magazine published in Toronto, since 2009.

Work with musicians
He often works and collaborates with musicians. He co-organized a Shogi (Japanese chess) performance event for girl punk legends Shonen Knife at the Gladstone Hotel, Toronto, in 2003. He directed a promotion video for "T-dog's theme" (2009) and design CD cover "JAfro" (2012) for his jazz pianist friend in New York, Toru Dodo.
As art director, he contributed a charity compilation album for victims of Japan earthquake entitled "MapleLeaf RisingSun" (2012) which was produced by Canadian music producer and bassist George Koller and George Rondina of Number 9 Audio Group.

He was presented with the "Best Artist" award from Now in 2002 and Eye Weekly in 2003 as one of the best local visual artists of the year. He also won Artfocus Magazine's Best in Mixed Media Award (2003) and Best in Pastel/Oil Stick Award (2000)

Other work
His work has been featured in design and set design on TV drama series Metropia (OMNI) in 2004.

His early work has been featured on cover of Canadian author Matthew Fox's Cities of Weather (Cormorant Books).

Awards

Selected solo exhibitions

References

External links
Official website:  http://tomolennon.com

1973 births
Living people
20th-century Canadian painters
Canadian male painters
21st-century Canadian painters
Japanese emigrants to Canada
People from Hokkaido
Japanese portrait painters
20th-century Canadian male artists
21st-century Canadian male artists